Rabe  (Riabe) is a village in the administrative district of Gmina Baligród, within Lesko County, Subcarpathian Voivodeship, in south-eastern Poland.

The village has a population of 333.

References

Rabe